The Õhne (also known as Suislepa and Hoomuli River) is a  long river in southern Estonia. Its source is Veisjärv Lake and mouth Võrtsjärv Lake, it also flows some kilometres in Latvia. The basin area of Õhne is 573 km2. The towns of Tõrva, Vooru and Suislepa are situated on the Õhne River.

Gallery

References

Rivers of Estonia
Rivers of Latvia
Landforms of Viljandi County
International rivers of Europe